Simeon Selby Pennewill (July 23, 1867 – September 10, 1935) was an American farmer and politician from Dover, in Kent County, Delaware. He was a member of the Republican Party, who served in the Delaware General Assembly and as Governor of Delaware.

Early life and family
Pennewill was born near Greenwood, Delaware, son of Simeon and Ann Curry Pennewill. The elder Simeon was one of the larger peach growers and owned the land that later became the town of Greenwood. He was also active in the Republican Party and served in the Governor's Guard during the Civil War. Simeon, the younger, was educated at Wilmington Conference Academy, now Wesley College in Dover. He married, later in life, after he served as governor, first in 1920, Lydia Wright Elder, and second in 1927, Elizabeth Halsey. There were no children by either marriage. They lived at 228 North State Street in Dover and he was a member of the Methodist Church.

Professional and political career
Pennewill inherited and continued to operate his family's peach orchards in Greenwood and Bridgeville. Pennewill was elected to two terms in the Delaware State Senate and served from the 1899/1900 session through the 1905/06 session.

Governor of Delaware
He then was elected Governor of Delaware by defeating Rowland G. Paynter, the Democratic Party candidate and served one term from January 19, 1909 until January 21, 1913. Like his predecessor, Pennewill began his career as an Addicks Republican, but was dedicated to reuniting the party.

The Delaware General Assembly at this time approved the sale of the Chesapeake and Delaware Canal to the Federal government, and passed the Boulevard Corporation Act, which provided the legal authority for T. Coleman du Pont to begin to build his privately funded highway the length of the state.

Delaware's antiquated whipping post again received embarrassing national attention. Out of state pressure forced Pennewill to reduce the number of lashings given in one sentence, but the pressure seemed to only intensify local opinion in favor of the use of the whipping post. He also made a controversial appointment to his elder brother, James Pennewill, the position of Chief Justice of Delaware. His brother served until his death 26 years later in 1935. It was during Pennewill's term that the DuPont Company lost its antitrust suit and was forced to divest itself of what became the Hercules Powder and Atlas Powder Companies.

Death and legacy
Pennewill died at Dover and is buried in the Bridgeville Methodist Cemetery at Bridgeville, Delaware.

Almanac
Elections are held the first Tuesday after November 1. Members of the Delaware General Assembly take office the second Tuesday of January. State Senators have a four-year term. The governor takes office the third Tuesday of January and has a four-year term.

References

Images
Hall of Governors Portrait Gallery ; Portrait courtesy of Historical and Cultural Affairs, Dover.

External links
Biographical Directory of the Governors of the United States
Delaware’s Governors 

The Political Graveyard

Places with more information
Delaware Historical Society; website; 505 North Market Street, Wilmington, Delaware 19801; (302) 655-7161
University of Delaware; Library website; 181 South College Avenue, Newark, Delaware 19717; (302) 831-2965

1867 births
1935 deaths
Methodists from Delaware
People from Dover, Delaware
Farmers from Delaware
Republican Party Delaware state senators
Republican Party governors of Delaware
Burials in Sussex County, Delaware
Wesley College (Delaware) alumni
People from Greenwood, Delaware
19th-century Methodists
20th-century Methodists